The Agricultural Reserve is a designated land use zone in Montgomery County, Maryland. The  zone was created in 1980 by the Montgomery County Council to preserve farm land and rural space in the northwestern part of the county. The farmland protection program has been characterized as "the most famous, most studied and most emulated" program of its kind in the United States.

Background

County residents and government planners began to notice the loss of agricultural land and open space as early as the 1950s, associated with the increase in suburbanization following World War II. The general demand for housing in the region was making the farm land increasingly attractive to developers, and the increased property values encouraged many farmers to sell. About one half of the county's farm land was converted to non-farm ownership by the 1960s. The Maryland-National Capital Park and Planning Commission noted a loss of  acres of farm land over an 8-year period in the 1970s, an average of 2,346 acres/year.

Following studies by a County task force and public discussion, the Council established the Agricultural and Rural Open Space Master Plan in 1980.  The overall goals of the agricultural zone are to preserve farms, productive soils, and a way of life. It seeks to preserve farmland through:
 Control of public costs and prevention of urban sprawl
 Adherence to County growth management systems
 Preservation of regional food supplies
 Energy conservation
 Protection of the environment
 Maintenance of open space
 Preservation of rural life styles.

The county government identified two contiguous areas in its northern region that would define the outer boundaries of the agricultural zone. However, the county decided that some of the remaining farmland and open space in this area could be preserved if future residential development was clustered.

Rural density transfer zone and Transferable Development Rights

The 1980 legislation authorized the County government to define a Rural Density Transfer Zone within the Agricultural Reserve, wherein development of new housing is limited to one house per . Previously the allowed density was one house per . The County Council compensated the rural property owners for their loss of developability, through the creation of a legal property right called a Transferable Development Right (TDR). The council assigned one TDR for every five acres of rural land in the designated area. A TDR could be sold to someone who wanted to build elsewhere in the county, at a greater density than would otherwise be allowed in that non-rural zone.

Montgomery County planners estimated that between 1981 and 2007 there were transactions that severed 9,700 TDRs from agricultural zone properties. About two-thirds of those rights were transferred to receiving area development projects elsewhere in the county. The county established a task force in 2001 to analyze and facilitate transactions between "supply" properties and receiving areas.

Reducing farmland fragmentation
In 2008 the County established a Building Lot Termination Program as an additional measure to address fragmentation of farmland. The program authorizes creation of easements on lots where the TDR program may not be applicable, to restrict non-agricultural land uses in the reserve zone. Similar in concept to a TDR, the easement creates a marketable credit for a landowner, and removes the right to build a dwelling unit on a lot. The landowner may sell the credit to a developer for use in another designated zone within the county. The program has preserved  acres of agricultural land as of 2016.

Benefits

According to an advocacy group, the reserve provides the following benefits:
 Provides pick-your-own produce
 Serves as a "green lung" for the greater Washington, D.C. area, cooling and cleaning the air
 Employs over 10,000 people
 Contributes $250 million to the economy
 Offers recreational activities
 riding
 cycling
 hiking
 longboarding
 canoeing
 fishing
 hunting
 Habitats for animals
 Historical sites:
 Civil War sites
 Underground Railroad
 18th and 19th century homes, barns, mills, and schools.

Potential changes
Among the challenges to maintaining the character of the Agricultural Reserve, are several listed by a local advocacy group: The high costs of operating a farm in Montgomery County; increased development of private facilities (e.g. private schools); and development of new highways.

References

 American Farmland Trust, Washington, DC (April 2008). "Transfer of Development Rights." Fact Sheet.
 

Land use
Agricultural Reserve
Rural culture in Maryland
Urbanization
Urban planning in the United States